Paulina is a 2015 internationally co-produced thriller film directed by Santiago Mitre. It was screened in the International Critics' Week section at the 2015 Cannes Film Festival where it won the Nespresso Grand Prize and the FIPRESCI Prize. It is inspired by the 1960 film La patota.

Cast
 Dolores Fonzi as Paulina
 Oscar Martínez as Fernando
 Esteban Lamothe as Alberto

Awards and accolades

Aside from winning the Critics Week and FIPRESCI prizes at Cannes, Paulina won some awards at other festivals including San Sebastián and the Havana Film Festival New York. Dolores Fonzi won the prize for best actress at the 2015 Premio Iberoamericano de Cine Fénix, and also at the 2015 Argentine Academy of Cinematography Arts and Sciences Awards.

References

External links
 

2015 thriller films
2015 films
Remakes of Argentine films
Argentine thriller films
Brazilian thriller films
French thriller films
Films about rape
Guaraní-language films
2010s Spanish-language films
2010s Argentine films
2010s French films